William Bourbank was Archdeacon of Carlisle from 1523 until his death.

Bourbank was educated at the University of Cambridge. He held livings at  Terrington, Barnack and  Christian Malford.

References

Archdeacons of Carlisle
Alumni of the University of Cambridge
16th-century English people